Saxe-Hildburghausen was an Ernestine duchy in the southern side of the present State of Thuringia in Germany. It existed from 1680 to 1826 but its name and borders are currently used by the District of Hildburghausen.

History
After the Duke of Saxe-Gotha, Ernest the Pious, died on 26 March 1675 in Gotha, the Principality was divided on 24 February 1680 among his seven surviving sons. The lands of Saxe-Hildburghausen went to the sixth son, who became Ernest II, the first Duke of Saxe-Hildburghausen. But the new Principality did not have complete independence. It had to depend on the higher authorities in Gotha for the matters of administration of its districts – the so-called "" – because Gotha was the residence of Ernest II's oldest brother, who ruled as Frederick I, Duke of Saxe-Gotha-Altenburg. Saxe-Hildburghausen did not become fully sovereign until 1702.

In the beginning, the Principality had the District and city of Hildburghausen, the District and city of Heldburg, the District and city of Eisfeld, the District of Veilsdorf and the half of the District of Schalkau. Two more districts were added – Königsberg in 1683 and Sonnefeld in 1705. When Albert V, the Duke of Saxe-Coburg, died in 1699 without any surviving descendants, disputes arose over the inheritance but, eventually, in 1714, Saxe-Hildburghausen agreed to exchange the District of Schalkau for parts of Saxony – a piece of the former Duchy of Saxe-Römhild, the District of Behrungen, including the winery, and the monastery estate of Milz as well as the former properties of the Echter family of Mespelbrunn.

In 1684 the city of Hildburghausen became the residence of the Duke so it was developed to reflect its new status. However, the elaborate buildings and courtyards of the princes strained the finances of the Principality so much that, in 1769, a forced management of debts by an Imperial Debit Commission had to be ordered. It was placed under the direction of the Regent, Charlotte Amalie of Saxe-Meiningen.

With the dissolution of the Holy Roman Empire in 1806, Saxe-Hildburghausen gained its full sovereignty as the Duchy of Saxe-Hildburghausen. A few months later, on 15 December 1806, it, along with the other Ernestine duchies, entered the Confederation of the Rhine. In 1815, it joined the German Confederation. In 1818, it was one of the first German states to receive a constitution.

The extinction of the oldest line, Saxe-Gotha-Altenburg in 1825 again led to inheritance disputes among the other lines of the Ernestine family. On 12 November 1826 the decision, from the arbitration of the supreme head of the family, King Frederick Augustus I of Saxony, resulted in the extensive rearrangement of the Ernestine duchies. Saxe-Hildburghausen lost the Districts of Königsberg and Sonnefeld to the new Duchy of Saxe-Coburg and Gotha and the rest of its territories to the Duchy of Saxe-Meiningen. But the last Duke of Saxe-Hildburghausen, Frederick, became the new Duke of Saxe-Altenburg.

In 1868, four districts were established in the Duchy of Saxe-Meiningen. One of them was Hildburghausen, with boundaries very similar to those of the former duchy. It remained almost unchanged until 1993, when the District of Suhl was dissolved and most of its municipalities joined the District of Hildburghausen.

Dukes of Saxe-Hildburghausen
 1680–1715 Ernest
 1715–1724 Ernest Frederick I
 1724–1745 Ernest Frederick II, from 1724 to 1728 under the Regency of his mother, Countess Sophia Albertine of Erbach-Erbach
 1745–1780 Ernest Frederick III Carl, from 1745 to 1748 under the Regency of his mother, Countess Caroline of Erbach-Fürstenau
 1780–1826 Frederick, since 1826 Duke of Saxe-Altenburg; from 1780 to 1787 under the Regency of his great granduncle Prince Joseph Frederick

Notable residents
 Sophie Henriette of Waldeck (1662–1702), Duchess of Saxe-Hildburghausen
 Eugene of Saxe-Hildburghausen (1730–1795), Prince of Saxe-Hildburghausen
 Louis Frederick of Saxe-Hildburghausen (1710–1759), Prince of Saxe-Hildburghausen
 Prince Joseph Frederick (1702–1787), Prince of Saxe-Hildburghausen
 Christiane Sophie Charlotte of Brandenburg-Bayreuth (1733–1757), Duchess of Saxe-Hildburghausen
 Ernestine Auguste Sophie of Saxe-Weimar-Eisenach (1740–1786), Duchess of Saxe-Hildburghausen
 Charlotte Georgine Luise of Mecklenburg-Strelitz (1769–1818), Duchess of Saxe-Hildburghausen
 Charlotte of Saxe-Hildburghausen (1787–1847), by marriage Princess of Württemberg, known as “Princess Paul of Württemberg” since then
 Therese of Saxe-Hildburghausen (1792–1854), by marriage Queen of Bavaria (who gave her name to a park in Munich, Theresienwiese and inspired, with her marriage, the Oktoberfest)
 Louise of Saxe-Hildburghausen (1794–1825), by marriage the Duchess of Nassau

Bibliography
  Johann Werner Krauß, Kirchen–, Schul– und Landeshistorie von Hildburghausen [Church, School and State History of Hildburghausen] (Greiz, 1780)

External links
  Sachsen-Hildburghausen in: Meyers Konversations-Lexikon, 4. Auflage, Band 14 [Meyers Conversational Dictionary, 4th Edition, Volume 14] (Leipzig: Bibliographisches Institut [Bibliographical Institute], 1885–1892), page 146

States and territories established in 1680
1680 establishments in the Holy Roman Empire
1826 disestablishments in Europe
Duchies of the Holy Roman Empire
States of the Confederation of the Rhine
States of the German Confederation
Hildburghausen
 
House of Wettin
Upper Saxon Circle
Former countries in Europe
Former principalities
South Thuringia